Exostoma berdmorei is a species of sisorid catfish from Myanmar and Thailand.

Etymology
The fish is named in honor of the late Major Hugh Thomas Berdmore (1811–1859) of the Madras Artillery, who provided the type specimen.

References

Talwar, P.K. and A.G. Jhingran, 1991. Inland fishes of India and adjacent countries. Volume 2. A.A. Balkema, Rotterdam.

Catfish of Asia
Fish of Myanmar
Fish of Thailand
Taxa named by Edward Blyth
Fish described in 1860
Sisoridae